0U (zero U) or 0-U may refer to:

0U, one of several Power Distribution Unit models for IBM products
0u+, a potential ground state in Electron spectroscopy

See also
U0 (disambiguation)